Nagpur is a city and winter capital of the state of Maharashtra, India.

Nagpur may also refer to:
 Greater Nagpur Metropolitan Area, which includes the city of Nagpur
 Nagpur district, of which Nagpur is the headquarters
 Nagpur Metro, a railway project of Nagpur city
 Nagpur Junction railway station, a railway station of Nagpur city
 Nagpur–Bhusawal section, a railway route
 Nagpur–Secunderabad line, a railway route
 Nagpur Police, a police station of Nagpur city
 Nagpur division, which includes Nagpur district
 Nagpur Municipal Corporation
 Nagpur Improvement Trust
 Nagpur Province, a former province of British India
 Nagpur kingdom, a former kingdom of British India
 Nagpur (Lok Sabha constituency)
 Nagpur West (Vidhan Sabha constituency)
 Nagpur Central Museum, a museum of Nagpur
  Nagpur airport, an airport of Nagpur city
 Nagpur Duronto Express
 Nagpur orange, a fruit type

See also
 Chota Nagpur (disambiguation)
 Nagpuri (disambiguation)
 Nagpuria (disambiguation)
 Nagpuri people, an ethnic group of India
 Nagpuri, an  Indo-Aryan language eastern India
 Nagpuriya dialect (Garhwal), an  Indo-Aryan language North-western India